Eduardo Hochschild (born 1963/64) is a Peruvian businessman. He is the chairman of Hochschild Mining and Cementos Pacasmayo.

Biography
Hochschild is the son of Ana Beeck Navarro and Luis Hochschild Plaut. His great-uncle, Moritz Hochschild, founded Hochschild Mining; and his great-uncle, Sali Hochschild, founded Compania Minera y Comercial Sali Hochschild S.A. In 1987, he graduated from the Tufts University School of Engineering with a degree in Engineering Physics. He then went to work for the family business as a mine safety assistant. In 1998, his father was killed in a kidnapping attempt and Eduardo assumed leadership of both companies.

Personal life
He is married to attorney Mariana Correa Sabogal, daughter of Gustavo Correa Miller and Dolores Sabogal Morzán; and the niece of former Peruvian first lady   and former Foreign Minister of Peru, . They have 4 children: Alexia, Nicolás, Sofía, and Michelle. In May 2022, Nicolas Hochschild was appointed Non-Executive Director of the board of Hochschild Mining 

As of October 2021, per Forbes magazine, he has a net worth of US$1.1B.

References

Living people
1960s births
People from Lima
Tufts University alumni
Tufts University School of Engineering alumni
Peruvian businesspeople
Peruvian billionaires
Businesspeople in metals
Eduardo